William Millar, Sr., (October 5, 1839February 5, 1913) was a Scotch-Irish American immigrant, farmer, and Wisconsin pioneer.  He was a member of the Wisconsin State Senate (1889 & 1891) and Assembly (1887), representing Dunn County.  His last name was spelled Miller in some historical sources.

Biography
Millar was born near Dublin, Ireland, on October 5, 1839.  He attended a select school in Ireland before emigrating with his family to the United States in 1850.  He was raised working with his father on a farm in Waukesha County, Wisconsin.  In 1857, the family moved to their own farm in what is now the town of Red Cedar, Wisconsin, and William was sent to attend high school at the nearby village of La Crosse, Wisconsin.

At age 19 went to work as a lumberman near Eau Claire, Wisconsin, for the Dole, Ingram & Kennedy company.  He worked 13 years in this profession and for the last seven years of that time, he was also a manager and investor in the logging company.  Over those years, he gradually accumulated land for his own estate in Red Cedar, eventually owning about 400 acres.

He was one of the founders of the Dunn County Agricultural Society in 1885 and served as its first president.  The following year, he was elected to the Wisconsin State Assembly, running on the Republican Party ticket.  Rather than running for re-election in 1888, he ran for and won a four-year term in the Wisconsin State Senate.  He did not run for re-election in 1892.

His health declined gradually over the subsequent years, and he died on his farm in Red Cedar on February 5, 1913.

Personal life and family
Millar was born to a Scottish father and Irish mother.  He was the second of eight children born to David Millar and his wife Margaret ( Riley).  Two of his younger brothers, James and Robert, fought for the Union Army in the American Civil War—James was killed at Spotsylvania Court House.

William Millar married Sarah Jane McCormick, the daughter of another Dunn County pioneer.  They had seven children together, though one son died in infancy.  Their eldest son, James David Millar, also went on to serve in the Wisconsin State Assembly.

Electoral history

Wisconsin Assembly (1886)

| colspan="6" style="text-align:center;background-color: #e9e9e9;"| General Election, November 2, 1886

Wisconsin Senate (1888)

| colspan="6" style="text-align:center;background-color: #e9e9e9;"| General Election, November 6, 1888

Notes

References

External links

1839 births
1913 deaths
Irish emigrants to the United States (before 1923)
People from Dunn County, Wisconsin
Republican Party Wisconsin state senators
Republican Party members of the Wisconsin State Assembly
Burials in Wisconsin
19th-century American politicians